Maro Joković (born 1 October 1987) is a Croatian water polo player. He is left-handed and plays in the right wing position. He competed at the 2008, 2012 and 2016 Olympics and won a gold medal in 2012 and a silver in 2016. He held the world title in 2007 and the European title in 2010.

Joković took up water polo aged seven at a local club near Dubrovnik. At the age of 14, he joined VK Jug Dubrovnik. He is currently studying economics at the University of Dubrovnik. He is married to Maria and has three daughters. In 2013, he worked as a model for fashion designer Ivana Barač.

At club level, Joković plays for Croatian powerhouse Jug Dubrovnik.

Honours

Club

Jug Dubrovnik

LEN Champions League: 2005–06, 2015–16 ; runners-up : 2006–07, 2007–08, 2012–13, 2016–17
LEN Super Cup: 2006, 2016
Croatian Championship: 2003–04, 2004–05, 2005–06 2006–07, 2008–09, 2009–10, 2010–11 2011–12, 2012–13, 2015–16, 2016–17, 2017–18, 2018–19, 2021–22
Adriatic League: 2009, 2016, 2017, 2018
Croatian Cup: 2005–06, 2006–07, 2007–08, 2008–09, 2009–10, 2015–16, 2016–17, 2017–18, 2018–19
Croatian Super Cup: 2022

Pro Recco

LEN Champions League: 2014–15
Serie A1: 2013–14, 2014–15
Coppa Italia: 2013–14, 2014–15

Olympiacos

Greek Championship: 2019–20
Greek Cup: 2019–20
Greek Super Cup: 2019
AN Brescia
Serie A1: 2020–21

Awards
Swimming World Magazine's man water polo ''World Player of the Year " award: 2012
Member of World Team  by total-waterpolo: 2019
Member of Second World Team of the Year's 2000–2020 by total-waterpolo
Fourth Top European Player in the World by LEN: 2016 
World League Top Scorer: 2012
Olympic Games 2012 Team of the Tournament
Croatian Championship Top Scorer 2015–16 with Jug Dubrovnik  
Croatian Championship Top Scorer 2018–19 with Jug Dubrovnik
Croatian Championship MVP 2018–19 with Jug Dubrovnik
Croatian "Athlete of the Year ": 2018–19
Best Croatian Right Wing of the Year: 2015, 2016, 2017, 2018, 2019, 2020, 2021
2019 World Championship Team of the Tournament
Croatian Water Polo Player of the Year: 2020 with Olympiacos , 2021 with Jug Dubrovnik

See also
 Croatia men's Olympic water polo team records and statistics
 List of Olympic champions in men's water polo
 List of Olympic medalists in water polo (men)
 List of world champions in men's water polo
 List of World Aquatics Championships medalists in water polo
 List of Swimming World Swimmers of the Year

References

External links

 

1987 births
Living people
Sportspeople from Dubrovnik
Croatian male water polo players
Water polo drivers
Left-handed water polo players
Water polo players at the 2008 Summer Olympics
Water polo players at the 2012 Summer Olympics
Water polo players at the 2016 Summer Olympics
Water polo players at the 2020 Summer Olympics
Medalists at the 2012 Summer Olympics
Medalists at the 2016 Summer Olympics
Olympic gold medalists for Croatia in water polo
Olympic silver medalists for Croatia in water polo
World Aquatics Championships medalists in water polo
Competitors at the 2013 Mediterranean Games
Mediterranean Games medalists in water polo
Mediterranean Games gold medalists for Croatia
Olympiacos Water Polo Club players
Expatriate water polo players
Croatian expatriate sportspeople in Greece
Croatian expatriate sportspeople in Italy
21st-century Croatian people